Villié-Morgon is a commune in the eastern French department of Rhône.

Twins cities
 Sasbachwalden

See also
Communes of the Rhône department

References

Communes of Rhône (department)
Rhône communes articles needing translation from French Wikipedia